Council of Higher Secondary Education, Odisha (abbreviated as CHSE (O)) is a Board of Education imparting Senior Higher Secondary (Class 11 & Class 12 Courses) for public and private schools, Colleges under the State Government of Odisha, India.

History
Council of Higher Secondary Education, Odisha was established in 1982, with accordance of Odisha Higher Secondary Act 1982, which was assented by the Governor of Odisha on 23 October 1982.

The Council of CHSE(O) was formed to regulate, control and develop Higher Secondary Education in the State of Odisha. Though the administrative function council commenced from 7 September 1982, in a rented building at Goutam Nagar, Bhubaneshwar. After some years the council constructed its own administrative building in Samantapur, Bhubaneshwar and started functioning in its own infrastructure from 2 January 1996. The new name of the campus is being christened as Prajnapitha.

Affiliations
CHSE(1) affiliates all state and private schools and colleges in the state of Odisha.

Courses offered
CHSE(O) Board conducts examinations in the streams of Arts, Science, Commerce, and Vocational Education, which includes subjects of:
Political Science
Economics
History
Mathematics
Physics
Chemistry
Botany
Zoology
Electronics
Computer Science
Bio-Technology
Computer Application & Statistics
Geography
Accountancy
Business Studies
Education
Information Technology
Physiology
Anthropology
Indian Music
Home Science
English
Hindi
Logic
Psychology 
Sanskrit

Examinations
The board conducts final examinations every spring for Higher Secondary Examination (HSE), Council of Higher Secondary Education Examinations (C.H.S.E.) and examinations of other courses prescribed by the Board for Class 12.

See also
Board of Secondary Education, Odisha
Department of Higher Education, Odisha

References

For CHSE Exam Notes
https://www.onlinelearncamp.com

External links

Department of Higher Education, Odisha
Education in Odisha
Educational institutions established in 1982
State secondary education boards of India
State agencies of Odisha
1982 establishments in Orissa